Chenzhou railway station is a railway station in Beihu District, Chenzhou, Hunan, China. It is an intermediate stop on the Beijing–Guangzhou railway.

History
The station opened in 1936. All passenger services were suspended on 10 April 2021 to allow the station to be rebuilt.

See also
Chenzhou train collision
Chenzhou West railway station

References

Railway stations in Hunan
Railway stations in China opened in 1936